The MV Aline Sitoe Diatta (named after the Senegalese freedom fighter) is a ferry in active service since March 2008 between Ziguinchor and Dakar over the Atlantic Ocean. The ship passes the mouth of the Gambia river.

There are two voyages per week in each direction. The voyage takes some 15 hours, including boarding and debarking.

The vessel was built in 2006-07 by Fr. Fassmer Shipyards in Berne, Germany.

See also
 Transport in Senegal
  (capsized in September 2002)

References

External links

 

Ferries of Senegal
Casamance
2007 ships